Sudden & Christenson Company was a shipping and lumber company founded in 1899. Edwin A. Christenson and Charles Sudden of San Francisco, California started the company and shipping line to supply northwest lumber to cities on the east coast, west coast and far east. The ships would return with goods and passengers from the remote ports. Some of the ships also had passenger service on the upper decks. Sudden & Christenson Company and Los Angeles Steamship Company-United American Line started a joint venture called the Arrow Line in 1926. Arrow Line operated from  Northwest Pacific Coast Ports and Argentina, Brazil and Uruguay. Sudden & Christenson's San Francisco Headquarters was at 110 Market Street with docks at Pier 15. Sudden & Christenson Company was incorporated in California in 1903. The Sudden & Christenson company dissolved in 1944 and Sudden & Christenson, Inc was founded to pay of the liability of franchise taxes, and operated till dissolved in 1965. Charles Sudden died in 1913 and Edwin Christenson became president with  D. Walter Rasor as vice president. The company started with schooners and added steamships. During World War I Sudden & Christenson operated Merchant navy ships for the United States Shipping Board. During World War II Sudden & Christenson was active with charter shipping with the Maritime Commission and War Shipping Administration. Sudden & Christenson had docks in San  Francisco, Vancouver, Seattle, Portland, Astoria, Los  Angeles and Yokohama, Kobe, Shanghai, Dalian and Tsingtao. Far East ports were a joint venture with the North China Line. In late 1950s came the more cost-effective loading and unloading system, container shipping. The Sudden & Christenson fleet, now aged and on an obsolete system, put the company in decline, closing in 1965.

Sudden & Christenson ships
Sudden & Christenson and Arrow Line ships:

Sophie Christenson, a 1901 schooner, 675 gross tons; 180.6' x 38.9' x 13.4', built by Hall Brothers at Pt. Blakely, WA.
Brooklyn, a wooden steam schooner, built in 1902 by J. Lindstrom of Aberdeen, Washington, a 250 horsepower, 2-cylinder compound engine, sank in 1930.
Slielton 
Norwood, built in 1904 by Hall Bros.
Edna Christenson (was Algoa and John A. Hooper) was built by Harlan & Hollingsworth in Wilmington DE. Purchased in 1927, sank on 24 January 1947 as SS Hu Kiang 
Ruby, three-masted schooner, built in 1902 by J. W. Dickie & Sons 345 ton, sold 1914.
Charles Christenson 839 gross, built in 1919 at West Hepburn. (sold renamed Plekhanov)
Carl Christensen
Edwin Christianson
Cecilia Sudden, a four-masted schooner, 643 tons built at Fairhaven, Calif. by the Bendixsen Shipbuilding Cobuilt in 1902, sold in 1915.
Helen Whittier, built in 1918 by Skinner & Eddy, Owned from 1929 to 1938. Sank by U-132 in 1942.
 John Palmer, a four-masted barkentine built in 1900,  1187 ton, sold in 1916 
Tara
Montoso, built in 1911 by Newport News Shipbuilding (US Navy 1918 to 1919) . 
Espada, Schooner 	built in 1902 by  Bendixsen,  777 tons, sank in 1919
Alvarado, built in 1914 by Graig in Long Beach, Ca. Ran aground off Marshfield, Ore. with cargo of lumber in 1945.  
Willapa, 779 tons built in 1908 by Dickie Bros,	wrecked near Vivorilla Cays in 1916.
Chehalis, built in 1901 by Bendixsen, 663 tons, scrapped 1938
Grays Harbor,  built in 1907 by Lindstrom Shipbuilding,  659 tons
Raymond 596 gross, wood steam schooner,  
Edna 1783 gross (was Mazallan) built by Laxevaags Maskin & Jernskibs in Bergen, Norway in 1903, purchased in 1914.
Caoba 579 gross, wood ship built in 1906, sank in 1926, with load of lumber
Carmel 633 gross, 1906; steam schooner 
Dumaru, built by Grant Smith-Porter of Portland, 1752 tons, sank October 1918.
Coquille River, wooden steam schooner built in 1896 at Prosper, Oregon by William Muller and C. Christensen. 415 tons and 141' long, sold in 1905.
USS West Bridge, also called Barbara Cates, and Pan Gulf.

Shipping Board ships
Shipping Board World War 1 ships operated by Sudden & Christenson:
West Kader, built by Builder	Western Pipe & Steel, in 1919. Sank during World War 2.
West Cahokia, built in 1920, sank 12 May 1942 by Uboat U-94 5720 gross, a Design 1019 ship
Crown City,  built in 1920 by Los Angeles Shipbuilding & Dry Dock, 5490 gross, a Design 1013 ship 
Westboro 5769 gross, a Design 1013 ship
Pansa 4839 gross, a Design 1014 ship 
West Hesseltine,  built by "J. F. Duthie & Company", Seattle, Washington in January 1920. Belorussia-class cargo ship, 5588 gross, a Design 1013 ship 
SS Topa Topa, built by Los Angeles Shipbuilding & Dry Dock Company in 1920. Torpedoed and sunk in August 1942 by U-66.
Haynie 6037 gross, a Design 1015 ship

World War II
Sudden & Christenson operated ships for World War II:
The ship was run by its Sudden & Christenson Company crew and the US Navy supplied United States Navy Armed Guards to man the deck guns and radio. The most common armament mounted on these merchant ships were the MK II 20mm Oerlikon autocannon and the 3"/50, 4"/50, and 5"/38 deck guns. 

Victory ships:
SS Hobbs Victory, 	Sank in battle April 6, 1945 at Kerama Islands, Okinawa, 12 of the crew were killed.
USNS Dalton Victory (T-AK-256)
Lafayette Victory
Loyola Victory
USNS Sunnyvale (T-AGM-5)
Belgium Victory
Burbank Victory
Canton Victory
Wesleyan Victory
Muncie Victory
New World Victory

Liberty ships:
SS Anne Hutchinson, Torpedoed and lost off South Africa 1942
Jose Marti
Josiah Snelling
Juan Pablo Duarte
Norman Hapgood
Chief Joseph
Chung Shan
SS Marcus Daly damaged in attack in 1944 in Philippines.
Simon Benson
John Adams Sank May 5, 1942, torpedoed by Japanese submarine I-21 off New Caledonia,  was on passage Noumea to Brisbane with drummed aviation fuel  
James Withycombe sank Dec. 19, 1943, ran aground off Cristobal, Panama. 
SS Junipero Serra

Crater-class cargo ship:
USS Azimech

Other
Roseville, was a Norway ship.
Anne Hanify, Built in 1920, lumber schooner SS Anne Hanify at Kruse & Banks Shipbuilding, North Bend, OR.

See also
Richmond Shipyards

External links
 Liberty Ships built by the United States Maritime Commission in World War II
Victory Ships built by the United States Maritime Commission in World War II

References

Transport companies established in 1899
Defunct shipping companies of the United States
1965 disestablishments in the United States
Transport companies disestablished in 1965
1899 establishments in California